Lorenzo Molajoli (1868 - 4 April 1939) was an Italian opera conductor who was active in recording during the 1920s and 1930s.

The facts surrounding Molajoli's career are obscure. He was born in Rome in 1868 and studied there at the Accademia di Santa Cecilia. His career began in 1891, and it would appear that much of his career prior to the First World War was spent in both North and South America, South Africa and various provincial Italian opera houses. Claims have been made that Molajoli conducted at La Scala in the inter-war years, but there is no published documentation to substantiate this assumption. What can be established is that he served with considerable distinction as the house conductor in Milan for Columbia Records, recording complete operas and accompanying a large number of singers, in addition to making recordings of a number of operatic overtures. Molajoli conducted twenty complete or abridged operas for Columbia between 1928 and 1932, including the first complete recordings of Rossini's The Barber of Seville, Ponchielli's La Gioconda and Boito's Mefistofele.  His concise, trenchant and swiftly paced conducting style is in the tradition of his compatriots Arturo Toscanini and Ettore Panizza.  A number of his complete opera recordings have been released on CD on Naxos and other labels. He died in Milan on 4 April 1939.

References

Discography
 
 
1927 & 30 - Rigoletto (Verdi) - Riccardo Stracciari, Mercedes Capsir, Dino Borgioli: La Scala Opera Orchestra and Chorus
1928 - La Bohème (Puccini) - Rosetta Pampanini, Luigi Marini, Gino Vanelli, Luba Mirella: La Scala Opera Orchestra and Chorus
1928 - Aida (Verdi) - Giannina Arangi-Lombardi, Aroldo Lindi, Maria Capuana: La Scala Opera Orchestra and Chorus
1928 - La Traviata (Verdi) - Mercedes Capsir, Lionello Cecil, Carlo Galeffi: La Scala Opera Orchestra and Chorus
1929 - Madama Butterfly (Puccini) - Rosetta Pampanini, Alessandro Granda, Gino Vanelli: La Scala Opera Orchestra and Chorus
1929 - Tosca (Puccini) - Bianca Scacciati, Alessandro Granda, Enrico Molinari: La Scala Opera Orchestra and Chorus
1929 - Il Barbiere di Siviglia (Rossini) - Riccardo Stracciari, Mercedes Capsir, Dino Borgioli: La Scala Opera Orchestra and Chorus
1930 - Le furie di Arlecchino (Lualdi) - Maria Zamboni, Enzo de Muro Lomanto: La Scala Opera Orchestra and Chorus
1930 - Ernani (Verdi) - Antonio Melandri, Iva Pacetti, Gino Vanelli: La Scala Opera Orchestra and Chorus
1930 - La favorita (Donizetti) - Carmelo Maugeli, Giuseppina Zinetti, Christy Solari: La Scala Opera Orchestra and Chorus
1930 - Pagliacci (Leoncavallo) - Francesco Merli, Rosetta Pampanini, Carlo Galeffi: La Scala Opera Orchestra and Chorus
1930 - Cavalleria Rusticana (Mascagni) - Giannina Arangi-Lombardi, Antonio Melandri: La Scala Opera Orchestra and Chorus
1930 - Il Trovatore (Verdi) - Francesco Merli, Bianca Scacciati, Giuseppina Zinetti, Enrico Molinari: La Scala Opera Orchestra and Chorus
1930 & 31 - Don Pasquale (Donizetti) - Attilio Giuliani, Ines Alfani-Tellini, Christy Solari: La Scala Opera Orchestra and Chorus
1930 & 31 - L'elisir d'amore (Donizetti) - Ines Alfani-Tellini, Christy Solari, Edoardo Faticanti: La Scala Opera Orchestra and Chorus
1931 - Andrea Chenier (Giordano) - Luigi Marini, Lina Bruna Rasa, Carlo Galeffi: La Scala Opera Orchestra and Chorus
1931 - Mefistofele (Boito) - Nazzareno de Angelis, Antonio Melandri, Mafalda Favero, Giannina Arangi-Lombardi: La Scala Opera Orchestra and Chorus
1931 - Fedora (Giordano) - Gilda Dalla Rizza, Antonio Melandri, Emilio Ghirardini, Luba Mirella, Eugenio Dall'Argine: La Scala Opera Orchestra and Chorus
1931 - La Gioconda (Ponchielli) - Giannina Arangi-Lombardi, Ebe Stignani, Alessandro Granda, Gaetano Viviani, Corrado Zambelli: La Scala Opera Orchestra and Chorus
1931 - Manon Lescaut (Puccini) - Maria Zamboni, Francesco Merli, Enrico Molinari; La Scala Opera Orchestra and Chorus
1932 - Carmen (Bizet) - Aurora Buades, Aureliano Pertile, Ines Alfani-Tellini, Benvenuto Franci: La Scala Opera Orchestra and Chorus
1932 - Falstaff (Verdi) - Giacomo Rimini, Pia Tassinari, Roberto D'Alessio, Emilio Ghirardini, Aurora Buades; La Scala Opera Orchestra and Chorus
1933 - Lucia di Lammermoor (Donizetti) - Mercedes Capsir, Enzo de Muro Lomanto, Enrico Molinari: La Scala Opera Orchestra and Chorus

1868 births
1939 deaths
Italian male conductors (music)
19th-century Italian male musicians
19th-century conductors (music)
20th-century Italian conductors (music)
Musicians from Rome
Accademia Nazionale di Santa Cecilia alumni
20th-century Italian male musicians
19th-century Italian musicians